Lassina Diomandé (born 24 June 1979 in Abidjan, Ivory Coast) is an Ivorian footballer who plays in the defender position. He currently plays for Lokomotiv Mezdra in the Bulgarian top division.

Career
After spending the first ten years of his career in his home country with Man Fc, Africa Sports National and Jeunesse Club d'Abidjan, Diomandé relocated to Bulgaria in February 2009, signing a contract with Lokomotiv Mezdra.

International career
He played for Ivory Coast national football team and was capped one time in 2001.

External links

1979 births
Expatriate footballers in Bulgaria
Ivorian footballers
Ivorian expatriate footballers
First Professional Football League (Bulgaria) players
Living people
Footballers from Abidjan
Ivorian expatriate sportspeople in Bulgaria
JC d'Abidjan players
Association football defenders
Ivory Coast international footballers